The 1937 All-Big Six Conference football team consists of American football players chosen by various organizations for All-Big Six Conference teams for the 1937 college football season.  The selectors for the 1937 season included the Associated Press (AP).

All-Big Six selections

Backs
 Johnny Howell, Nebraska (AP-1)
 Howard Cleveland, Kansas State (AP-1)
 Jack Baer, Oklahoma (AP-1)
 Clarence Douglass, Kansas (AP-1)

Ends
 Pete Smith, Oklahoma (AP-1)
 Elmer Dohrmann, Nebraska (AP-1)

Tackles
 Fred Shirey, Nebraska (AP-1)
 Anthony Krueger, Kansas State (AP-1)

Guards
 Robert Mehring, Nebraska (AP-1)
 Edwin Bock, Iowa State (AP-1)

Centers
 Charles Brock, Nebraska (AP-1)

Key
AP = Associated Press

See also
1937 College Football All-America Team

References

All-Big Six Conference football team
All-Big Eight Conference football teams